
Gmina Mysłakowice is a rural gmina (administrative district) in Karkonosze County, Lower Silesian Voivodeship, in south-western Poland.

Neighbouring gminas
Gmina Mysłakowice is bordered by the towns of Jelenia Góra and Kowary and the gminas of Janowice Wielkie, Kamienna Góra and Podgórzyn.

Villages
The gmina contains the villages of Bukowiec, Dąbrowica, Gruszków, Karpniki, Kostrzyca, Krogulec, Łomnica, Mysłakowice, Strużnica and Wojanów.

References

Myslakowice
Karkonosze County